Vogia is a genus of moths of the family Erebidae. The genus was erected by Francis Walker in 1858.

Species
Vogia amplivitta Walker, 1858
Vogia mimica Felder, 1874

References

Calpinae